Slow (stylized; SLOW) is the fourteenth studio album by Starflyer 59. Tooth & Nail Records released the album on June 17, 2016.

Critical reception

Tim Sendra writes, "Since the album is so short, and since he does try to be something else, it makes for one of the least satisfying of Starflyer 59's many albums." Andy Argyrakis describes, "the Jason Martin-led act not only returns to Tooth & Nail Records, but also turns in another textbook batch of its lo-fi atmospheres and melodic textures that could fit right in alongside any current band on Pitchfork’s tastemaking playlists. Lyrically speaking, the guys sound older, wiser and at their most reflective, sure to be another sticking point for their extremely dedicated fan base and also a thought-provoking entry point for the hipster kids coming up." Jonathan J. Francesco states, "The songs probe deep themes of love and nostalgia, of regret and the past. The vocals are subdued and relaxed, and the music is a laid-back rock that has just enough energy to propel things along. The two make for a haunting mix that is definitely something I am curious to explore more on repeat listens, and also to take a second look at the band's past albums."

Bersain Beristain says, "Slow makes no fault at all. It's not solely dependent on one side of Starflyer 59's many colorful faces, but rather, it allows us to see them all with balance. Sure, it doesn't reinvent the band to catapult them into the glory days of their metallic albums, but it does well what it sought out to do. In a time where indie rock is stagnating compared to the growth it saw in the first decade of the millennium, Martin reminds me that not only is there hope for the genre, but more importantly, for Starflyer 59 itself." Michael Weaver responds, "he most certainly has 'so much left to give.'" Mark Rice calls, "it a highly refreshing, highly enjoyable (and even thoughtful) listen." Scott Fryberger mentions, "Slow is a solid way to return from a short break."

Track listing

Charts

References

2016 albums
Starflyer 59 albums
Tooth & Nail Records albums